The Comedians is an American comedy television series starring Billy Crystal and Josh Gad as fictional versions of themselves.  A 13-episode first season was ordered by FX, and premiered on April 9, 2015. The series was developed by Larry Charles, Billy Crystal, Matt Nix, and Ben Wexler. On July 23, 2015, the series was cancelled after one season.

Because of the merge between Fox Television Studios and Fox 21, The Comedians was the first production by Fox 21 Television Studios.

It is an adaptation of the Swedish SVT series Ulveson och Herngren.

Cast
 Billy Crystal as Billy, a superstar veteran comedian
 Josh Gad as Josh, a younger, edgier comic
 Matt Oberg as Mitch, the head writer of Billy and Josh's sketch show
 Stephnie Weir as Kristen, an anxiety-ridden producer
 Megan Ferguson as Esme, a PA on the show
 Dana Delany as Julie, Billy's wife

Guest Stars
 Mel Brooks as himself
 Rob Reiner as himself
 Jimmy Kimmel as himself 
 Sugar Ray Leonard as himself 
 Larry Charles as himself
 Robert Lopez as himself 
 Kristen Anderson-Lopez as herself
 Steven Weber as Jamie Dobbs
 Rick Glassman as Clifford

Episodes

Reception
The Comedians received mixed reviews from critics. On Rotten Tomatoes, the series has a rating of 58%, based on 38 reviews, with an average rating of 7.1/10. The site's critical consensus reads, "Though The Comedians' material doesn't break any TV molds, the stars' comic abilities push the show over the median with well-earned laughs." On Metacritic, the series has a score of 57 out of 100, based on 30 critics, indicating "mixed or average reviews".

References

External links

2010s American late-night television series
2010s American mockumentary television series
2010s American sketch comedy television series
2015 American television series debuts
2015 American television series endings
English-language television shows
Cultural depictions of comedians
Cultural depictions of actors
FX Networks original programming
Television series by 20th Century Fox Television
Television series about television